Phiala tanganyikae is a moth in the family Eupterotidae. It was described by Strand in 1911. It is found in Tanzania.

References

Moths described in 1911
Eupterotinae